The long-billed woodcreeper (Nasica longirostris) is a species of bird in the woodcreeper subfamily Dendrocolaptinae of the ovenbird family Furnariidae. It is the only species placed in the genus Nasica.

The long-billed woodcreeper is genetically most closely related to the cinnamon-throated woodcreeper (Dendrexetastes rufigula). The species is monotypic: no subspecies are recognised.

Distribution and habitat
It is found in the Amazon Basin of  Brazil, and Amazonian Colombia, Ecuador, Peru, and Bolivia; also the middle and upper Orinoco River Basin of Venezuela. It is also found in most of French Guiana bordering the northeast Amazon Basin and the Brazilian state of Amapá.
Its natural habitats are subtropical or tropical moist lowland forest and subtropical or tropical swamps.

References

External links
Long-billed woodcreeper videos on the Internet Bird Collection
Long-billed woodcreeper photo gallery VIREO
Photo-High Res; Article tropicalbirding

long-billed woodcreeper
Birds of the Amazon Basin
long-billed woodcreeper
Taxa named by Louis Jean Pierre Vieillot
Birds of Brazil
Taxonomy articles created by Polbot